SS Gulfwave was a Gulf Oil Corporation tanker that operated from 1937 to 1956. She was torpedoed during World War II. but returned to service after repairs. From 1956 to 1959 she operated as the Liberian Michael J.

Construction
Bethlehem Steel Company at Sparrows Point, Maryland. She was launched on 9 October 1937 as the third of four tankers built at Sparrows Point for Gulf Oil. The construction made greater use of welding than in the previous two tankers of the series. She was delivered to Gulf Oil on 1 December 1937.

Characteristics

Service history
Gulfwave operated with the Gulf Oil fleet until taken by the War Shipping Administration for World War II service on 20 April 1942. Gulf Oil subsequently operated her under an agreement with the United States Army, revised to a time charter on 29 June 1944. After the war, the ship returned to company operations on 20 November 1945.

Gulfwave suffered no casualties among her merchant mariners or United States Navy Armed Guard personnel, and she arrived at Suva in Fiji under her own power. After temporary repairs at Suva, Gulfwave arrived at Pago Pago in American Samoa on 29 March 1943 for further repairs. She departed Pago Pago on 13 May 1943 bound for Hawaii. Permanent repairs were made at Portland, Oregon.

Gulfwave was sold to Liberian interests in January 1956, renamed Michael J., and was scrapped in 1959.

References

External links 
 A web page that provides access to a database on WWII convoys including the sailing dates and names of ships in convoys.
 USS DENVER Decklog mentions Gulfwave
 Doc file that lists the ss Gulfwave

1937 ships
Tankers of the United States
World War II merchant ships of the United States
Tankers of Liberia